German submarine U-130 was a Type IXC U-boat of Nazi Germany's Kriegsmarine during World War II. She was laid down at the DeSchiMAG AG Weser yard, Bremen as yard number 993 on 20 August 1940, launched on 14 March 1941 and commissioned on 11 June.

Her service life began with training in the 4th U-boat Flotilla; she moved to the 2nd Flotilla for more training on 1 September 1941 and operations with the same organization on 1 December.

She was a member of three wolfpacks.

Design
German Type IXC submarines were slightly larger than the original Type IXBs. U-131 had a displacement of  when at the surface and  while submerged. She had two shafts and two  propellers.

U-131 was fitted with six  torpedo tubes (four fitted at the bow and two at the stern), 22 torpedoes, one  SK C/32 naval gun, 180 rounds, and a  SK C/30 as well as a  C/30 anti-aircraft gun. The boat had a complement of forty-eight.

Service history

First and second patrols
The boat's operational debut was her departure from Kiel on 1 December 1941. Crossing the North Sea, she entered the Atlantic Ocean via the gap between the Faroe and the Shetland Islands. She sank Kurdistan northwest of Northern Ireland on the tenth before docking at Lorient in occupied France on the 16th. U-130 would use this port for the rest of her career.

The submarine was unsuccessfully attacked by an aircraft on 12 January 1942 in the Cabot Strait, between Nova Scotia and Newfoundland on her second patrol. She then sank two ships on the 13th east of Nova Scotia. She was almost sunk by two Canadian destroyers on the 18th, but the winter weather played a part, hampering both sides. The U-boat moved south, to warmer waters.

Third, fourth and fifth patrols
U-130s third patrol was marked by using her deck gun in conjunction with her torpedoes in the western north Atlantic and the eastern Caribbean when she sank Grenanger on 11 April 1942 and Esso Boston a day later.

The boat's fourth sortie also brought success, this time near the Cape Verde islands. Among others, she sank Tankexpress, Elmwood and Danmark, all in July 1942.

She tried to impede the landings for Operation Torch, the invasion of North Africa, when she sank three troop transports at anchor off Morocco on 12 November 1942. The boat then headed off into the Atlantic, north of the Azores.

Sixth patrol and loss
Her last patrol was not without success; she sank Trefusis, Fidra,  and Ger-y-Bryn, all on 5 March 1943.

There were no survivors.

Wolfpacks
U-130 took part in three wolfpacks, namely:
 Schlagetot (9 – 21 November 1942) 
 Westwall (21 November – 16 December 1942) 
 Unverzagt (12 March 1943)

Summary of raiding history

References

Notes

Citations

Bibliography

External links

World War II submarines of Germany
1941 ships
Ships built in Bremen (state)
German Type IX submarines
U-boats commissioned in 1941
U-boats sunk in 1943
U-boats sunk by depth charges
U-boats sunk by US warships
World War II shipwrecks in the Atlantic Ocean
Maritime incidents in March 1943